Kinkaid Lake State Fish and Wildlife Area is an Illinois state park on  in Jackson County, Illinois, United States.

References

State parks of Illinois
Protected areas of Jackson County, Illinois
Protected areas established in 1968
1968 establishments in Illinois